Mimotriammatus nigrosignatus is a species of beetle in the family Cerambycidae, and the only species in the genus Mimotriammatus. It was described by Breuning in 1972.

References

Lamiini
Beetles described in 1972